İsmail Kurt (1 January 1934 – 27 February 2017) was a Turkish football player, who played as a defender, and manager. Kurt was best known for his stints with rivals Galatasaray and Fenerbahçe, and with the latter he won three Süper Lig titles.

Personal life
İsmail is the brother of the footballer Metin Kurt.

Death
Kurt died on 27 February 2017 and had a ceremony arranged by Fenerbahçe.

Honours
Galatasaray
Istanbul Football League (1): 1957–58

Fenerbahçe
Süper Lig (3): 1961–1962, 1963–64, 1964–65

References

External links
 
 

1934 births
2017 deaths
People from Çaycuma
Turkish footballers
Turkey international footballers
Turkey B international footballers
Turkish football managers
Association football defenders
Galatasaray S.K. footballers
Fenerbahçe S.K. footballers
Vefa S.K. footballers
Süper Lig players
TFF First League players